The year 1991 is the 3rd year in the history of Shooto, a mixed martial arts promotion based in the Japan. In 1991 Shooto held 7 events beginning with, Shooto: Shooto.

Title fights

Events list

Shooto: Shooto

Shooto: Shooto was an event held on January 13, 1991, at Korakuen Hall in Tokyo, Japan.

Results

Shooto: Shooto

Shooto: Shooto was an event held on March 29, 1991, at Korakuen Hall in Tokyo, Japan.

Results

Shooto: Shooto

Shooto: Shooto was an event held on May 31, 1991, at Korakuen Hall in Tokyo, Japan.

Results

Shooto: Shooto

Shooto: Shooto was an event held on August 3, 1991, at Korakuen Hall in Tokyo, Japan.

Results

Shooto: Shooto

Shooto: Shooto was an event held on August 25, 1991, at Korakuen Hall in Tokyo, Japan.

Results

Shooto: Shooto

Shooto: Shooto was an event held on October 17, 1991, at Osaka Prefectural Gymnasium in Osaka, Japan.

Results

Shooto: Shooto

Shooto: Shooto was an event held on December 23, 1991, at Korakuen Hall in Tokyo, Japan.

Results

See also 
 Shooto
 List of Shooto champions
 List of Shooto Events

References

Shooto events
1991 in mixed martial arts